{{Speciesbox
| genus = Berosus
| species = chevrolati
| authority = Zaitzev, 1908
| synonyms =
Berosus aculeatus <small>Chevrolat, 1863 non LeConte, 1855</small>
}}Berosus chevrolati'' is a species of hydrophilid beetles from Cuba.

References

Hydrophilinae
Beetles described in 1908
Endemic fauna of Cuba